The wet exit is a simple technique for exiting from a capsized kayak while wearing a spray skirt. It involves reaching forward and pulling the spray skirt's grab loop to release the spray skirt, after which the kayaker can push themself out of the kayak.

References

Kayaking techniques